The High Commissioner of Australia to Papua New Guinea is an officer of the Australian Department of Foreign Affairs and Trade and the head of the High Commission of the Commonwealth of Australia in Papua New Guinea. The High Commissioner resides in Port Moresby and, since February 2020, has been Jon Philp. The high commission's work has been assisted since 6 February 2017 by a consulate-general in Lae.

Posting history
The Australian Government has offered diplomatic representation in Papua New Guinea since the establishment of self-government for the Territory of Papua and New Guinea in December 1973. The Australian Government administrator in Papua New Guinea was retitled as High Commissioner, which was continued as a solely diplomatic post once PNG gained independence from 16 September 1975.

Lae consulate
On 18 April 1975, a consular office was opened in the city of Lae, which was later upgraded to a consulate-general from 16 September 1975 upon independence. However, due to resource constraints in foreign affairs with the new Liberal/National government of Malcolm Fraser, the post was scaled down from late 1978, with the responsibilities of the consulate passed to the Deputy High Commissioner in Port Moresby, Max Hughes, and was completely closed down in December 1981. The post remained closed until the appointment and opening of an Honorary Consulate on 24 July 1989, which lasted until the reopening of the Consulate-General in February 2017 as part of a significant expansion of Australia's global diplomatic presence.

Heads of mission

Consuls-general in Lae

See also
Australia–Papua New Guinea relations
Foreign relations of Australia
Foreign relations of Papua New Guinea

References

External links

Australian High Commission, Papua New Guinea

 
Papua New Guinea
Australia